The 2010 LPGA of Korea Tour was a series of weekly golf tournaments for female golfers that took place in Korea and China from December 2009 through November 2010.. The tournaments were sanctioned by the LPGA of Korea Tour (KLPGA), a second-tier world golf tour for women.

The tour included 22 tournaments, all were held in Korea except the season-opening Orient China Ladies Open which was held in China. Lee Bo-mee topped the money list with winnings of (₩557,376,856).

2010 Schedule and results

Events in bold are majors.

LPGA Hana Bank Championship is co-sanctioned with LPGA.
Daishin Securities-Tomato Tour Korean Ladies Masters is co-sanctioned with Ladies European Tour.

See also
2010 in golf

External links

LPGA of Korea Tour
LPGA of Korea Tour